Emőke Énekes-Szegedi (1 January 1948 – 20 May 1987) was a Hungarian volleyball player. She competed at the 1972 Summer Olympics and the 1980 Summer Olympics.

References

External links
 

1948 births
1987 deaths
Hungarian women's volleyball players
Olympic volleyball players of Hungary
Volleyball players at the 1972 Summer Olympics
Volleyball players at the 1980 Summer Olympics
Sportspeople from Győr-Moson-Sopron County